German submarine U-792 was a Type XVIIA U-boat of Nazi Germany's Kriegsmarine during the Second World War. She was one of a small number of U-boats fitted with Hellmuth Walter's high test peroxide propulsion system, which offered a combination of air-independent propulsion and high submerged speeds. She spent the war as a trials vessel and was scuttled on 4 May 1945 in the Audorfer See, near Rendsburg.

Construction 
The U-792 was laid down on 1 December 1942 at the Blohm & Voss shipyard in Hamburg, Germany. She was launched on 28 September 1943 and commissioned on 16 November 1943 under the command of Oberleutnant zur See Horst Heitz.

She was assessed at  submerged. She had one shaft and one  propeller.

The submarine was fitted with two  torpedo tubes (All fitted at the bow) and four torpedoes. The boat had a complement of 12 men.

Service History And End
U-792 did not undertake any combat patrols and was instead assigned as a trials boat at first to the 5th U-boat Flotilla, followed by the 8th U-boat Flotilla, before returning to the 5th flotilla for the rest of the war and was used in March 1945 as a floating fuel bunker. In December 1944, her commander was replaced by Oberleutnant zur See Hans Diederich Duis.

The U-792 was scuttled on 4 May 1945 at 01:30 in the Audorfer See (Kaiser Wilhelm Canal), near Rendsburg during Operation Regenbogen.

Wreck 
The wreck of U-792 lay at  until 26 May 1945, when she was lifted by the British and taken to the Howaldtswerke in Kiel to be examined. She was first raised as a British prize and used for trials, but was soon torn down for parts and finally scrapped.

References

Bibliography

German Type XVII submarines
U-boats commissioned in 1943
World War II submarines of Germany
Ships built in Hamburg
Operation Regenbogen (U-boat)
1943 ships
Maritime incidents in May 1945